The Weekly Republican Address is delivered by a different prominent Republican each week, in response to the Weekly Address of the President of the United States during a Democratic presidency. When a Republican has held the Presidency, the President delivers the weekly address, such as occurred during 2001–2009 under George W. Bush, and most recently, Donald Trump, 2017-2021.

2009 Weekly Republican Address speakers 

Democrat President Barack Obama inaugurated on January 20. Democrats hold "super majorities" in both Senate and House.

2010 Weekly Republican Address speakers 

After the United States elections of 2010, Republicans took back the majority in the House of Representatives, and achieved a net gain in the Senate, decreasing the Democratic majority.

2011 Weekly Republican Address speakers 

After the January 5 inaugurations, all positions won in the November 2010 elections were officially filled.

2012 Weekly Republican Address speakers 

After the United States elections in 2012, Democrat President Barack Obama defeated Republican nominee Mitt Romney, Democrats increased their majority in the Senate, and Democrats made a net gain in the U.S. House, although Republicans continued to hold the House majority.

2013 Weekly Republican Address speakers 

After the United States elections in 2012, Democrat President Barack Obama defeated Republican nominee Mitt Romney, Democrats increased their majority in the Senate, and Democrats made a net gain in the U.S. House, although Republicans continued to hold the House majority.

2014 Weekly Republican Address speakers

2015 Weekly Republican Address speakers

2016 Weekly Republican Address speakers

2017 Weekly Republican Address speakers 

With Donald Trump winning the United States elections in 2016, Republicans ended their response videos of the Weekly Address as they now hold the presidency and control of both houses in Congress. Republicans only made one response video for 2017, as Trump began holding a weekly Presidential address after his inauguration. Trump started giving out Weekly Addresses as President on January 28, while the Democrats started their addresses the day after the Inauguration on January 21, beginning with Senate Minority Leader Chuck Schumer of New York.

2021 Weekly Republican Address speakers 

It was resumed upon Trump’s loss of re-election to Joe Biden in the 2020 Election

See also

Weekly Democratic Address - Democratic Counterpart during a Republican Presidency
Weekly Radio Address of the President of the United States

References

External links 

 YouTube Channel for the Republican Party's Weekly Addresses

Republican Party (United States)